The Tampa Bay Rays' 2009 season was their 12th season of baseball on the Gulf Coast of Florida. The team attempted to defend their American League Championship they won in the previous season. Although they missed the playoffs, they still finished with a winning record (84–78) – only the second in franchise history.

Summary

Offseason
For the most part, the Rays' main roster remained intact. Eric Hinske's contract expired at the end of the 2008 season, and the team did not exercise options on Rocco Baldelli, Cliff Floyd or Trever Miller, making all four free agents. None were offered salary arbitration. In addition, Jonny Gomes was non-tendered on December 12, 2008, making him a free agent as well.

During the offseason, starting pitcher Edwin Jackson was traded to the Detroit Tigers for corner outfielder and Tampa native Matt Joyce. Prior to that, the Rays also considered a trade with the Florida Marlins for corner outfielder Jeremy Hermida, but declined to make a deal. They also considered trading with the Minnesota Twins to re-acquire center fielder Delmon Young, whom they traded (along with Brendan Harris) to the Twins in the 2007–08 offseason for Matt Garza and Jason Bartlett.

The Rays signed relief pitcher Joe Nelson to a one-year, $1.3-million deal on December 30.

The Rays had discussions with free agents for a designated hitter, including Jason Giambi, Bobby Abreu and Milton Bradley. They also considered re-signing Baldelli as a full-time DH. However, on January 5, 2009, they signed ex-Phillie left fielder Pat Burrell to a two-year deal worth $16 million.

On January 12, outfielder Gabe Kapler was signed to a one-year, $1-million deal.

On February 17, free agent infielder Adam Kennedy was signed to a minor-league contract and invited to spring training.

The only player who was eligible for salary arbitration that went to a hearing was catcher Dioner Navarro. He lost his hearing on February 10, and was given $2.1 million for 2009; he sought $2.5 million. Two players avoided arbitration: shortstop Jason Bartlett, who signed a one-year contract just short of $2 million on January 20; and Willy Aybar, who signed a two-year deal with an option for 2011 worth up to $4.5 million on February 18.

Matt Garza, Andy Sonnanstine and B. J. Upton all had their contracts renewed, and the Rays signed 15 other players on February 25.

At the end of spring training, starting pitcher Jason Hammel was traded to the Colorado Rockies for pitching prospect Aneury Rodríguez. Jeff Niemann joined James Shields, Scott Kazmir, Matt Garza and Andy Sonnanstine in the starting rotation to begin the season, as David Price was optioned to Triple-A Durham.

Organizational changes
Quality control coach Tim Bogar was hired by the Boston Red Sox to be their first base coach. Todd Greene signed on to replace Bogar in Tampa Bay.

The Rays unveiled a new third jersey to be used in 2009, which is a dark blue shirt with the Rays logo.  The color is similar to the main color of their batting practice jersey, but without the different-colored panels on the sides. The manta ray logo will not appear on the alternate jersey.

The team's spring training operations will move from St. Petersburg to the rebuilt Charlotte County Stadium in Port Charlotte.  Previously, they used Al Lang Field in St. Petersburg for spring training, and the Vince Naimoli Sports Complex for extended spring training.

Charlotte County Stadium will also be home of their Advanced-A Florida State League minor league franchise, the former "Vero Beach Devil Rays", who will be renamed to the Charlotte Stone Crabs. In addition, their regular Class A franchise in the South Atlantic League will move from Columbus, Georgia, to Bowling Green, Kentucky, and become the Bowling Green Hot Rods.  Their Appalachian League Rookie-class team, previously known as the "Princeton Devil Rays", will become known as the Princeton Rays, excising the "Devil" from the name and adopting the team colors and typeface after previously using the green-based color scheme from 2001, and the original typeface from 1998.  The only minor league teams that will not change are the Double-A Montgomery Biscuits and the Short-A Hudson Valley Renegades.

The Rays will also open a second Rookie-class team in the Gulf Coast League, the Gulf Coast Rays, which will also play at Charlotte County Stadium.

Media changes
Fox Sports Florida will take over the entire television contract, the beginning of an eight-year exclusive contract, and will broadcast 75 games, with another 75 games broadcast on sister network Sun Sports. It is unknown how much of the schedule will be broadcast in HD. Some cable networks have not begun to air games that are on Sun Sports, because of a disagreement on what fees the networks will pay the station for the games. The companies still in dispute will not broadcast games airing on Sun Sports.

Dewayne Staats returned as the play-by-play announcer, but Joe Magrane moved to MLB Network. On February 16, it was made official that Kevin Kennedy would split time in the booth with Brian Anderson, as well as Todd Kalas, who is currently the Rays' pre-, post- and in-game host.

At least five games will appear as Saturday afternoon games nationally on MLB on Fox: May 9 at Boston, May 16 hosting Cleveland, May 30 hosting Minnesota, June 20 at the New York Mets, and August 29 at Detroit. The May 10 game at Boston aired on ESPN's Sunday Night Baseball, just the second time the Rays appeared on the premier primetime package. More games may be moved to national coverage during the season.  The season opener at Boston on April 6 was scheduled to air on ESPN, but was postponed to the next day, April 7, and the rescheduled game was not picked up by ESPN.  The July 5 game at Texas aired on ESPN's Sunday Night Baseball.

620 WDAE was announced as the new radio flagship. Sister station 1250 WHNZ had been the previous flagship station since 2005, but WDAE aired some Monday night games in 2008. Andy Freed and Dave Wills will return to do play-by-play with Rich Herrera serving as pre- and post-game host. All three will be in their fifth season with the team, after replacing the team's original radio announcers, Paul Olden and Charlie Slowes, after the 2004 season.

Regular season

April
The Rays began their American League title defense on the road against division rival Boston. Before a pitch was even thrown, the Rays already had a franchise first. Their scheduled Opening Day was postponed due to inclement weather, making it the first time that the first game of the season for the Rays had been postponed. After dropping the rescheduled season opener the following day, the Rays ended up winning the next two games of the series. This was the first opening series win for the Rays since 2002, when they swept the Detroit Tigers in a 3-game set.

The Rays came home after splitting their first two series, opening Tropicana Field against the New York Yankees, and raising their American League East and AL Championship banners on April 13. B. J. Upton returned to the team having started the season on the disabled list. There was also a moment of silence held for Harry Kalas, Phillies radio announcer and father of Rays television analyst Todd Kalas, who died earlier in the day. The Rays won their home opener, 15–5.

Matt Garza lost a bid for a perfect game in the 7th inning against the Boston Red Sox when Jacoby Ellsbury hit an infield single. Retiring the first 18 batters, this was the furthest any Ray pitcher had taken a perfect game, as well as the first time any Ray pitcher had retired 18 batters consecutively.

Evan Longoria, with a .369 batting average, 6 home runs, a tie for the American League lead in RBI with 24, and a slugging percentage of .714, was awarded with the Player of the Month award for the American League. This was the first time a member of the Rays had won the award.

The Rays finished the month 9–14, and were  games behind first place. They had not won a series since the opening series in Boston. Their longest win streak was two, which occurred twice.

May
On May 3, Carl Crawford set a team record and tied a modern-day league record with six stolen bases. The last player to steal six bases was Eric Young while he was a member of the Colorado Rockies on June 30, 1996. It was only the fifth time since 1912 that a player had stolen that many bases, which was also the last year it had happened in the American League. After the game Crawford stated that he didn't know he had tied a record, or else he would have made an attempt for seven.

On May 15, the Rays trailed the Cleveland Indians 7–0 after the top of the 4th inning, but would rally to score eight unanswered runs over the remainder of the game to win, capped off by a walk-off home run by B. J. Upton to lead off the bottom of the 9th inning. At the time, this was the largest come from behind win in franchise history, but remains the largest deficit overcome at home. Previously, the Rays had never won a game in which they had trailed by at least seven runs. They had come back from a six-run deficit on five occasions.

Prior to a game against the Cleveland Indians on May 17, Rays manager Joe Maddon incorrectly filled out a lineup card that listed Evan Longoria and Ben Zobrist both as the third baseman. As the plan was to have Zobrist play the position at third base and have Longoria as the designated hitter, having them both as the third baseman left the Rays without a player listed as the designated hitter in their official lineup card. As stated in part of Rule 6.10(b) in the official rulebook of the league, "It is not mandatory that a club designate a hitter for the pitcher, but failure to do so prior to the game precludes the use of a Designated Hitter for that game." Indians manager Eric Wedge brought the error to the attention of the umpires at the beginning of the bottom of the first inning. Because there was no designated hitter, and since Zobrist had already taken the field as the third baseman, the Rays would have to use starting pitcher Andy Sonnanstine as the third batter in the lineup where Longoria would normally bat. Longoria would enter the game later, in the seventh inning as a triple-switch when Sonnanstine was relieved from the game, moving Zobrist to right field in place of Gabe Kapler and shifting the pitcher's spot to seventh. Almost a week after the game, MLB umpiring vice president Mike Port stated that the umpires were wrong in allowing Longoria to come into the game at any point after it began. The Rays ultimately won the game, 7–5. Sonnanstine went 1-for-3 with an RBI double.

On May 22, the Rays placed Troy Percival and Scott Kazmir on the 15-day disabled list, and called up infielder Reid Brignac and relief pitcher Dale Thayer. The move left the Rays with four starting pitchers, suggesting another move may be made later on to fill the vacant starting role later on.

The Rays lost starting second baseman Akinori Iwamura for the season to a leg injury that occurred on May 24 against the Florida Marlins. While Iwamura was making an effort to turn a double play, Marlins infielder Chris Coghlan awkwardly slid into Iwamura's leg in an attempt to disrupt the throw to first base. Iwamura fell to the ground and had to be taken off the field on a cart. The next day after an MRI, it was announced that he suffered a torn ACL, "involvement" on the MCL, in addition to torn ligaments in his ankle. Even before the announcement was made, hopes of a speedy recovery were not promising, as Iwamura was seen around the clubhouse on crutches "saying goodbye", and as Rays shortstop Jason Bartlett put it, "From what I heard, he's not going to be back soon." Bartlett himself would be put on the disabled list one day later, with a sprained ankle.

David Price, the team's first overall pick in the 2007 MLB draft, made his season debut on the road against the Cleveland Indians on May 25. After 100 pitches in  innings, Price was taken out of the game.

On the same night as Price's first start of the 2009 season, the Rays jumped out to a 10–0 lead over the Indians, but were unable to win the game, as their opponents rallied for 11 unanswered runs. The Rays allowed 7 runs to cross the plate in the bottom of the 9th inning, ended by a walk-off 2-run single by Víctor Martínez. The Indians scored their last five runs with two outs, as the game's last six batters reached base. This having been the first of a 4-game set for the Rays on the road, the Indians eventually won every game in the series, extending the Rays' losing streak for road games against Cleveland to 17 games. The last time the Rays won in Cleveland was September 28, 2005.

At the end of May, the Rays were 25–28, 4th place in the division, and  games out of first place. They were 5 games behind first place for the Wild Card.

June
On June 22, Akinori Iwamura underwent surgery to repair the injuries suffered the month before. It was discovered that his ACL was only partially torn, meaning he would not require reconstructive surgery. Instead, an arthroscopic surgery was performed, and a report on the successful operation stated that he could return in 6–8 weeks.

On June 28, the Rays became the fastest team to hit 100 home runs and steal 100 bases in a single season, needing only 77 games. They were the fifth to do it before the all-star break, and the first since the Florida Marlins in 2003 to do so.

The Rays would go 19–7 in the month, improving their overall record to 44–35, and riding a seven-game winning streak into July. They set a new franchise record for home runs in one month with 41. While not having gained much ground on the division lead, finishing the month 4 games behind, in the wild card race, they went into July only  games behind.

Carlos Peña led the American League in home runs at the end of June with 23, which was third best in the entire league.

For the second time in the season, a Rays player was named the American League's Player of the Month. B. J. Upton, with a .324 batting average, 5 home runs, 22 RBI, 10 doubles, a .562 slugging percentage, a .395 on-base percentage, and league best 14 stolen bases, won the award this time.

July
Unfortunately the Rays' winning streak did not carry over into the next month. They lost their first four games in July, including being swept on the road by the Texas Rangers, and did not win until their first home game of the month. By the All-Star break, the Rays were 48–41. They were  games behind first place in the division, and  behind for the Wild Card.

Four Rays were selected to make the All-Star Game. Evan Longoria, after having to rely on the All-Star Final Vote to take the final spot on the roster in his rookie year in 2008, was elected as the starting 3rd baseman by the fans. Longoria had the third highest votes out of players in the American League, but did not participate in the game due to an infection in his finger. Making the All-Star roster by means of player voting, was Carl Crawford, his third selection, and Jason Bartlett, his first selection. As manager of the American League champions in the previous season's World Series, Joe Maddon automatically became a manager of the American League All-Stars. Part of his job as manager was to select players for the team after the fans and players voted. One of Maddon's selections was the Rays' own Ben Zobrist, which was his first selection to the midsummer classic.

The Rays would send a fifth player, making it the most they had ever sent to one All-Star Game, which was a record that had been set the previous season. Carlos Peña, who had never been to the All-Star Game, was a nominee for the All-Star Final Vote, a process in which fans choose one of five players in each league to take the final roster spots on the All-Star squads. Voting began after the initial All-Star rosters were announced. To help garner votes for Peña, the Rays started the "Vote for 'Los" campaign, having T-shirts made with Peña's face on them which players wore during batting practice. The Rays asked fans to bring their laptop computers to Tropicana Field and vote online during the game, as well as using advertisements, online commercials, fliers, merchandise, and even a video message from comedian Rob Schneider. Despite all efforts, Peña would ultimately finish fourth in the voting. Brandon Inge of the Detroit Tigers received the most votes to get the last remaining spot. Even though he didn't win, Peña said he was flattered and humbled to see how many were in support of him to make the All-Star Game. Peña would eventually make the team anyway as a replacement to Dustin Pedroia, who would have been the starting 2nd baseman, as he pulled out due to a "serious family health matter" involving his wife.

Peña would also take part in the Home Run Derby. In the first round, he hit 5 home runs, good enough for fourth place. Two other participants would do the same, and so a "swing-off" was needed to determine who would advance to the next round. In the tiebreaker, Peña would only hit one home run, and was eliminated after Albert Pujols hit two.

Crawford was named MVP of the All-Star Game, for taking a home run away from Brad Hawpe in the bottom of the 7th inning. Had Crawford not made the catch, Hawpe would have broken a 3–3 tie in favor of the National League. Crawford's grab turned out to be a major factor in the game, as the American League would go on to win 4–3.

On July 23, Mark Buehrle of the Chicago White Sox threw a perfect game against the Rays.  It was only the eighteenth perfect game in  Major League Baseball history.

On the road against the Toronto Blue Jays on July 25, the Rays were down 8–0 after four innings, and losing 9–1 entering the 7th inning. However the Rays would score eight runs over the next 3 innings to tie the game, including two solo home runs in the 9th inning. The game would enter extra innings, where the Rays would take a one-run lead into the bottom of the 12th inning. Joe Nelson would come in to pitch as the Rays' last remaining relief pitcher available. The Blue Jays would load the bases with one out, but could not capitalize. This became the largest come from behind win in franchise history for the Rays, a record previously set earlier in the season.

Finishing the month with an even 12–12 record, the Rays had an overall record of 56–47. Even with the fifth-most wins in the American League, they were 6 games behind for the lead in the division, and  games behind for the wild card. They made no big moves on the July 31 trade deadline, though they were rumored to be interested in several players, including Victor Martinez and Cliff Lee of the Indians. Ultimately, Martinez would be traded to Boston, while Lee was sent to Philadelphia.

August
On August 7, the Rays acquired catcher Gregg Zaun from the Baltimore Orioles for a player to be named later. To make room for Zaun, the Rays designated another catcher, Michel Hernández.

On August 29, the Rays sent starting pitcher Scott Kazmir to the Los Angeles Angels of Anaheim in exchange for two minor league prospects and a player to be named later. Initially, there was confusion about whether or not a deal had been made, or if it had been in the works before falling through. Kazmir himself said he knew nothing about a trade, asking reporters who were questioning him if they were joking. The Rays would not confirm that a trade was being made, but a leak to the news by the Angels reportedly almost led the Rays to call it off because of their policy to notify the player first. The websites for ESPN and MLB reported in the afternoon that the trade had been completed, however MLB took down their report and replaced it with a story stating that the trade would not occur. Kazmir was in uniform for the Rays that night as they played the Detroit Tigers, but was not the starting pitcher in the game. After the conclusion of the game, it was confirmed by the Rays that Kazmir had been dealt. Drafted by the New York Mets, the Rays acquired Kazmir in a trade considered to be one of the best in franchise history. In his six seasons with the Rays, Kazmir became the club's all-time leader in wins, strikeouts, and games started. He was also the team's record holder for ERA and strikeouts in a single season. In 2007, Kazmir led the majors in strikeouts with 239. He was also a two-time all-star, and the winning pitcher in the 2008 All-Star Game. Andrew Friedman, the Rays' Executive Vice President of Baseball Operations, said that Kazmir's contract was not the primary reason that he was traded, but was an element in the decision.

A day after the Kazmir trade, the Rays activated Akinori Iwamura from the disabled list.

Going 15–12 for the month, the Rays had a 71–59 record overall, assuring themselves of having at least the second best season in franchise history. The Rays had fallen behind the New York Yankees for the division lead by  games, but were still within reach of the wild card, trailing the Boston Red Sox by only 5 games.

September/October
When rosters expanded on the first day of September, the Rays called up four players. Relief pitcher Jeff Bennett, outfielder Fernando Perez, catcher Shawn Riggans, and starting pitcher Andy Sonnanstine, with Sonnanstine scheduled to start for the Rays that night.

The Rays were struggling to keep up in the wild card race, but took a blow to their lineup on September 7 when Carlos Peña, who was leading the American League in home runs, was hit on his fingers by a pitch during the first game of a doubleheader. It wasn't until after that first game that the Rays announced Peña had two fractured fingers and would be out for the remainder of the season. Peña said that it was a wonder that he didn't pass out from the pain of taking a fastball to the fingers, and that the X-ray of his middle finger looked like "a pencil snapped in half", but upon the realization of having to miss the rest of the year, "hurt more than the hit by pitch itself."

If losing Peña wasn't bad enough for the Rays, their losing streak at the time reached 11 games before it was snapped, although they never fell below a .500 record. On September 22, the Rays were officially eliminated from postseason contention, but would still finish with the second winning season in team history, winning their 82nd game of the season on September 30. They went 11–17 in the month of September.

B. J. Upton became the first player in franchise history to hit for the cycle, doing so on October 2, against the New York Yankees. Upton hit a triple, a double, a home run, and a single, in that order, all before five innings were completed. He would later add another single to finish the night 5 for 5 with a career-high 6 RBIs.

Though they were not successful in defending the division and league championships won in 2008, the Rays did finish the season 3rd place in the AL East with an 84–78 record.

Evan Longoria was given a Gold Glove award for third base in the American League on November 10. Longoria, who was the AL's 2008 Rookie of the Year, became the second player in Rays history to win a gold glove after first baseman Carlos Peña, who won in 2008.

Season standings

Record vs. opponents

Game log 

|-  style="text-align:center; background:#bbb;"
| || April 6 || @ Red Sox || colspan=6 |Postponed
|-  style="text-align:center; background:#fbb;"
| 1 || April 7 || @ Red Sox || 5–3 || Beckett (1–0) || Shields (0–1) || Papelbon (1) || 37,057 || 0–1
|-  style="text-align:center; background:#bfb;"
| 2 || April 8 || @ Red Sox || 7–2 || Kazmir (1–0) || Lester (0–1) || Balfour (1) || 37,552 || 1–1
|-  style="text-align:center; background:#bfb;"
| 3 || April 9 || @ Red Sox || 4–3 || Garza (1–0) || Matsuzaka (0–1) || Percival (1) || 37,784 || 2–1
|-  style="text-align:center; background:#fbb;"
| 4 || April 10 || @ Orioles || 5–4 || Hendrickson (1–0) || Sonnanstine (0–1) || Sherrill (2) || 22,866 || 2–2
|-  style="text-align:center; background:#fbb;"
| 5 || April 11 || @ Orioles || 6–0 || Guthrie (2–0) || Niemann (0–1) || || 15,108 || 2–3
|-  style="text-align:center; background:#bfb;"
| 6 || April 12 || @ Orioles || 11–3 || Shields (1–1) || Eaton (0–1) || || 15,531 || 3–3
|-  style="text-align:center; background:#bfb;"
| 7 || April 13 || Yankees || 15–5 || Kazmir (2–0) || Wang (0–2) || || 36,973 || 4–3
|-  style="text-align:center; background:#fbb;"
| 8 || April 14 || Yankees || 7–2 || Burnett (2–0) || Howell (0–1) || || 36,973 || 4–4
|-  style="text-align:center; background:#fbb;"
| 9 || April 15 || Yankees || 4–3 || Bruney (1–0) || Percival (0–1) || Rivera (2) || 25,171 || 4–5
|-  style="text-align:center; background:#fbb;"
| 10 || April 16 || White Sox || 3–2 || Danks (1–0) || Niemann (0–2) || Jenks (3) || 13,803 || 4–6
|-  style="text-align:center; background:#bfb;"
| 11 || April 17 || White Sox || 6–5 || Shields (2–1) || Thornton (0–1) || Percival (2) || 28,927 || 5–6
|-  style="text-align:center; background:#fbb;"
| 12 || April 18 || White Sox || 8–3 || Buehrle (2–0) || Kazmir (2–1) || || 31,916 || 5–7
|-  style="text-align:center; background:#fbb;"
| 13 || April 19 || White Sox || 12–2 || Floyd (2–1) || Garza (1–1) || || 29,142 || 5–8
|-  style="text-align:center; background:#fbb;"
| 14 || April 21 || @ Mariners || 4–2 || Washburn (3–0) || Sonnanstine (0–2) || Morrow (4) || 19,582 || 5–9
|-  style="text-align:center; background:#bfb;"
| 15 || April 22 || @ Mariners || 9–3 || Niemann (1–2) || Jakubauskas (1–2) || || 16,476 || 6–9
|-  style="text-align:center; background:#fbb;"
| 16 || April 23 || @ Mariners || 1–0 || Hernández (3–0) || Shields (2–2) || Morrow (5) || 17,639 || 6–10
|-  style="text-align:center; background:#bfb;"
| 17 || April 24 || @ Athletics || 8–2 || Kazmir (3–1) || Cahill (0–2) || || 20,140 || 7–10
|-  style="text-align:center; background:#fbb;"
| 18 || April 25 || @ Athletics || 5–2 || Braden (2–2) || Garza (1–2) || Ziegler (4) || 15,432 || 7–11
|-  style="text-align:center; background:#fbb;"
| 19 || April 26 || @ Athletics || 7–1 || Eveland (1–1) || Sonnanstine (0–3) || || 18,689 || 7–12
|-  style="text-align:center; background:#bfb;"
| 20 || April 27 || @ Twins || 7–1 || Niemann (2–2) || Baker (0–3) || || 17,988 || 8–12
|-  style="text-align:center; background:#fbb;"
| 21 || April 28 || @ Twins || 4–3 || Nathan (1–0) || Howell (0–2) || || 18,974 || 8–13
|-  style="text-align:center; background:#fbb;"
| 22 || April 29 || @ Twins || 8–3 || Blackburn (2–1) || Kazmir (3–2) || || 21,715 || 8–14
|-  style="text-align:center; background:#bfb;"
| 23 || April 30 || Red Sox || 13–0 || Garza (2–2) || Beckett (2–2) || || 20,341 || 9–14
|-

|-  style="text-align:center; background:#bfb;"
| 24 || May 1 || Red Sox || 6–2 || Sonnanstine (1–3) || Masterson (2–1) || || 27,045 || 10–14
|-  style="text-align:center; background:#fbb;"
| 25 || May 2 || Red Sox || 10–6 || Wakefield (3–1) || Niemann (2–3) || || 34,910 || 10–15
|-  style="text-align:center; background:#bfb;"
| 26 || May 3 || Red Sox || 5–3 || Shields (3–2) || Penny (2–1) || Percival (3) || 32,332 || 11–15
|-  style="text-align:center; background:#fbb;"
| 27 || May 4 || Orioles || 8–4 || Báez (2–1) || Kazmir (3–3) || || 12,658 || 11–16
|-  style="text-align:center; background:#bfb;"
| 28 || May 5 || Orioles || 6–3 || Garza (3–2) || Uehara (2–3) || Percival (4) || 13,174 || 12–16
|-  style="text-align:center; background:#bfb;"
| 29 || May 6 || @ Yankees || 4–3  (10) || Balfour (1–0) || Coke (1–2) || Percival (5) || 42,585 || 13–16
|-  style="text-align:center; background:#bfb;"
| 30 || May 7 || @ Yankees || 8–6 || Shouse (1–0) || Rivera (0–1) || Nelson (1) || 43,769 || 14–16
|-  style="text-align:center; background:#fbb;"
| 31 || May 8 || @ Red Sox || 7–3 || Penny (3–1) || Shields (3–3) || || 37,745 || 14–17
|-  style="text-align:center; background:#bfb;"
| 32 || May 9 || @ Red Sox || 14–5 || Kazmir (4–3) || Lester (2–3) || Cormier (1) || 37,773 || 15–17
|-  style="text-align:center; background:#fbb;"
| 33 || May 10 || @ Red Sox || 4–3 || Ramírez (3–0) || Shouse (1–1) || Papelbon (8) || 37,759 || 15–18
|-  style="text-align:center; background:#fbb;"
| 34 || May 12 || @ Orioles || 7–5 || Bass (2–1) || Sonnanstine (1–4) || Sherrill (6) || 17,122 || 15–19
|-  style="text-align:center; background:#bfb;"
| 35 || May 13 || @ Orioles || 8–6 || Niemann (3–3) || Bergesen (1–1) || Howell (1) || 13,237 || 16–19
|-  style="text-align:center; background:#fbb;"
| 36 || May 14 || Indians || 11–7 || Carmona (2–4) || Shields (3–4) || || 17,169 || 16–20
|-  style="text-align:center; background:#bfb;"
| 37 || May 15 || Indians || 8–7 || Wheeler (1–0) || Vizcaíno (0–1) || || 25,827 || 17–20
|-  style="text-align:center; background:#bfb;"
| 38 || May 16 || Indians || 4–2 || Garza (4–2) || Pavano (3–4) || Nelson (2) || 34,235 || 18–20
|-  style="text-align:center; background:#bfb;"
| 39 || May 17 || Indians || 7–5 || Sonnanstine (2–4) || Huff (0–1) || Percival (6) || 28,841 || 19–20
|-  style="text-align:center; background:#bfb;"
| 40 || May 18 || Athletics || 13–4 || Niemann (4–3) || Gallagher (1–2) || || 11,420 || 20–20
|-  style="text-align:center; background:#fbb;"
| 41 || May 19 || Athletics || 4–1  (11) || Casilla (1–1) || Wheeler (1–1) || || 12,842 || 20–21
|-  style="text-align:center; background:#fbb;"
| 42 || May 20 || Athletics || 7–6 || Anderson (1–4) || Kazmir (4–4) || Ziegler (5) || 13,721 || 20–22
|-  style="text-align:center; background:#bfb;"
| 43 || May 21 || Athletics || 6–5 || Nelson (1–0) || Ziegler (0–1) || || 14,374 || 21–22
|-  style="text-align:center; background:#bfb;"
| 44 || May 22 || @ Marlins || 15–2 || Sonnanstine (3–4) || Nolasco (2–5) || || 16,226 || 22–22
|-  style="text-align:center; background:#bfb;"
| 45 || May 23 || @ Marlins || 10–3 || Balfour (2–0) || Núñez (2–2) || || 20,253 || 23–22
|-  style="text-align:center; background:#fbb;"
| 46 || May 24 || @ Marlins || 5–4  (11) || Sanches (1–0) || Cormier (0–1) || || 12,839 || 23–23
|-  style="text-align:center; background:#fbb;"
| 47 || May 25 || @ Indians || 11–10 || Sowers (1–2) || Isringhausen (0–1) || || 20,929 || 23–24
|-  style="text-align:center; background:#fbb;"
| 48 || May 26 || @ Indians || 5–1 || Pavano (5–4) || Garza (4–3) || || 18,754 || 23–25
|-  style="text-align:center; background:#fbb;"
| 49 || May 27 || @ Indians || 12–7 || Aquino (1–0) || Sonnanstine (3–5) || Vizcaíno (1) || 19,335 || 23–26
|-  style="text-align:center; background:#fbb;"
| 50 || May 28 || @ Indians || 2–1 || Herges (1–0) || Niemann (4–4) || Wood (8) || 27,356 || 23–27
|-  style="text-align:center; background:#bfb;"
| 51 || May 29 || Twins || 5–3 || Shields (4–4) || Baker (2–6) || Choate (1) || 19,358 || 24–27
|-  style="text-align:center; background:#bfb;"
| 52 || May 30 || Twins || 5–2 || Price (1–0) || Liriano (2–7) || Choate (2) || 36,052 || 25–27
|-  style="text-align:center; background:#fbb;"
| 53 || May 31 || Twins || 3–2 || Blackburn (5–2) || Garza (4–4) || Nathan (9) || 26,579 || 25–28
|-

|-  style="text-align:center; background:#bfb;"
| 54 || June 2 || Royals || 6–2 || Sonnanstine (4–5) || Davies (2–5) || || 13,604 || 26–28
|-  style="text-align:center; background:#bfb;"
| 55 || June 3 || Royals || 9–0 || Niemann (5–4) || Bannister (4–3) || || 15,256 || 27–28
|-  style="text-align:center; background:#bfb;"
| 56 || June 4 || Royals || 3–2 || Shields (5–4) || Wright (0–2) || Howell (2) || 16,103 || 28–28
|-  style="text-align:center; background:#bbb;"
| || June 5 || @ Yankees || colspan=6 |Postponed
|-  style="text-align:center; background:#bfb;"
| 57 || June 6 || @ Yankees || 9–7 || Howell (1–2) || Rivera (0–2) || Choate (3) || 46,205 || 29–28
|-  style="text-align:center; background:#fbb;"
| 58 || June 7 || @ Yankees || 4–3 || Aceves (4–1) || Balfour (2–1) || Rivera (13) || 46,465 || 29–29
|-  style="text-align:center; background:#fbb;"
| 59 || June 8 || @ Yankees || 5–3 || Pettitte (6–2) || Sonnanstine (4–6) || Rivera (14) || 44,706 || 29–30
|-  style="text-align:center; background:#fbb;"
| 60 || June 9 || Angels || 4–3 || Weaver (6–2) || Shields (5–5) || Fuentes (16) || 16,087 || 29–31
|-  style="text-align:center; background:#bfb;"
| 61 || June 10 || Angels || 9–5 || Cormier (1–1) || Lackey (1–2) || || 15,658 || 30–31
|-  style="text-align:center; background:#bfb;"
| 62 || June 11 || Angels || 11–1 || Balfour (3–1) || Santana (1–3) || || 17,086 || 31–31
|-  style="text-align:center; background:#bfb;"
| 63 || June 12 || Nationals || 4–3 || Howell (2–2) || Villone (3–2) || || 18,273 || 32–31
|-  style="text-align:center; background:#bfb;"
| 64 || June 13 || Nationals || 8–3 || Sonnanstine (5–6) || Bergmann (0–1) || || 30,586 || 33–31
|-  style="text-align:center; background:#bfb;"
| 65 || June 14 || Nationals || 5–4 || Wheeler (2–1) || Villone (3–3) || Howell (3) || 25,841 || 34–31
|-  style="text-align:center; background:#bfb;"
| 66 || June 16 || @ Rockies || 12–4 || Niemann (6–4) || de la Rosa (2–7) || || 28,582 || 35–31
|-  style="text-align:center; background:#fbb;"
| 67 || June 17 || @ Rockies || 5–3 || Cook (6–3) || Price (1–1) || Street (14) || 26,460 || 35–32
|-  style="text-align:center; background:#fbb;"
| 68 || June 18 || @ Rockies || 4–3 || Jiménez (6–6) || Garza (4–5) || Street (15) || 28,639 || 35–33
|-  style="text-align:center; background:#fbb;"
| 69 || June 19 || @ Mets || 5–3 || Nieve (2–0) || Sonnanstine (5–7) || Rodríguez || 38,493 || 35–34 
|-  style="text-align:center; background:#bfb;"
| 70 || June 20 || @ Mets || 3–1 || Shields (6–5) || Santana (2–0) || Howell (3) || 37,992 || 36–34
|-  style="text-align:center; background:#bfb;"
| 71 || June 21 || @ Mets || 10–6 || Nelson (2–0) || Parnell || || 38,791 || 37–34
|-  style="text-align:center; background:#fbb;"
| 72 || June 23 || Phillies || 10–1 || Moyer (5–6) || Price (1–2) || || 38,971 || 37–35
|-  style="text-align:center; background:#bfb;"
| 73 || June 24 || Phillies || 7–1 || Garza (5–5) || Blanton (4–4) || || 19,608 || 38–35
|-  style="text-align:center; background:#bfb;"
| 74 || June 25 || Phillies || 10–4 || Sonnanstine (6–7) || Bastardo (2–3) || || 20,141 || 39–35
|-  style="text-align:center; background:#bfb;"
| 75 || June 26 || Marlins || 7–3 || Howell (3–2) || Pinto (2–1) || || 20,972 || 40–35
|-  style="text-align:center; background:#bfb;"
| 76 || June 27 || Marlins || 3–2 || Howell (4–2) || Badenhop (5–3) || || 35,790 || 41–35
|-  style="text-align:center; background:#bfb;"
| 77 || June 28 || Marlins || 5–2 || Price (2–2) || Miller || Howell (5) || 29,459 || 42–35
|-  style="text-align:center; background:#bfb;"
| 78 || June 29 || @ Blue Jays || 4–1 || Niemann (7–4) || Halladay (10–2) || Choate (4) || 15,665 || 43–35
|-  style="text-align:center; background:#bfb;"
| 79 || June 30 || @ Blue Jays || 4–1 || Garza (6–5) || Richmond (6–5) || Howell (6) || 15,477 || 44–35
|-

|-  style="text-align:center; background:#fbb;"
| 80 || July 1 || @ Blue Jays || 5–0 || Romero (7–3) || Shields (6–6) || || 30,533 || 44–36
|-  style="text-align:center; background:#fbb;"
| 81 || July 3 || @ Rangers || 3–1 || Hunter (1–1) || Kazmir (4–5) || Francisco (13) || 39,123 || 44–37
|-  style="text-align:center; background:#fbb;"
| 82 || July 4 || @ Rangers || 12–4 || Holland (2–5) || Price (2–3) || || 43,809 || 44–38
|-  style="text-align:center; background:#fbb;"
| 83 || July 5 || @ Rangers || 5–2 || Feldman (7–2) || Garza (6–6) || Francisco (14) || 22,324 || 44–39
|-  style="text-align:center; background:#bfb;"
| 84 || July 7 || Blue Jays || 3–1 (11) || Wheeler (3–1) || League (1–4) || || 15,244 || 45–39
|-  style="text-align:center; background:#bfb;"
| 85 || July 8 || Blue Jays || 10–9 || Howell (5–2) || Frasor (5–2) || || 15,252 || 46–39
|-  style="text-align:center; background:#bfb;"
| 86 || July 9 || Blue Jays || 3–1 || Price (3–3) || Halladay (10–3) || Wheeler (1) || 25,749 || 47–39
|-  style="text-align:center; background:#bfb;"
| 87 || July 10 || Athletics || 6–0 || Niemann (8–4) || Mazzaro (2–5) || || 20,358 || 48–39
|-  style="text-align:center; background:#fbb;"
| 88 || July 11 || Athletics || 7–2 || Braden (7–7) || Garza (6–7) || || 33,273 || 48–40
|-  style="text-align:center; background:#fbb;"
| 89 || July 12 || Athletics || 7–3 || Wuertz (5–1) || Wheeler (3–2) || Bailey (10) || 29,727 || 48–41
|- style="text-align:center;"
| colspan="9" style="background:#bbcaff;"|All-Star Break: AL defeats NL, 4–3
|-  style="text-align:center; background:#bfb;"
| 90 || July 17 || @ Royals || 8–7 || Nelson (3–0) || Cruz (3–3) || Howell (7) || 33,568 || 49–41
|-  style="text-align:center; background:#bfb;"
| 91 || July 18 || @ Royals || 4–2 || Bradford (1–0) || Cruz (3–4) || Howell (8) || 30,288 || 50–41
|-  style="text-align:center; background:#bfb;"
| 92 || July 19 || @ Royals || 4–3 || Balfour (4–1) || Wright (0–3) || Howell (9) || 18,934 || 51–41
|-  style="text-align:center; background:#fbb;"
| 93 || July 20 || @ White Sox || 4–3 || Floyd (8–6) || Price (3–4) || Jenks (22) || 39,024 || 51–42
|-  style="text-align:center; background:#bfb;"
| 94 || July 21 || @ White Sox || 3–2 || Niemann (8–4) || Jenks (2–3) || Howell (10) || 23,319 || 52–42
|-  style="text-align:center; background:#fbb;"
| 95 || July 22 || @ White Sox || 4–3 || Carrasco (3–0) || Wheeler (3–3) || Thornton (1) || 26,257 || 52–43
|-  style="text-align:center; background:#fbb;"
| 96 || July 23 || @ White Sox || 5–0 || Buehrle (11–3) || Kazmir (4–6) || || 28,036 || 52–44
|-  style="text-align:center; background:#bfb;"
| 97 || July 24 || @ Blue Jays || 4–2  (10) || Garza (7–7) || Downs (1–2) || Howell (11) || 24,161 || 53–44
|-  style="text-align:center; background:#bfb;"
| 98 || July 25 || @ Blue Jays || 10–9 (12) || Howell (6–2) || Camp (0–5) || Nelson (3) || 26,527 || 54–44
|-  style="text-align:center; background:#fbb;"
| 99 || July 26 || @ Blue Jays || 5–1 || Cecil (4–1) || Niemann (9–5) || || 30,610 || 54–45
|-  style="text-align:center; background:#fbb;"
| 100 || July 27 || Yankees || 11–4 || Burnett (10–4) || Shields (6–7) || Robertson (1) || 33,442 || 54–46
|-  style="text-align:center; background:#bfb;"
| 101 || July 28 || Yankees || 6–2 || Kazmir (5–6) || Sabathia (10–7) || || 32,304 || 55–46
|-  style="text-align:center; background:#fbb;"
| 102 || July 29 || Yankees || 6–2 || Chamberlin (7–2) || Garza (7–8) || || 32,398 || 55–47
|-  style="text-align:center; background:#bfb;"
| 103 || July 31 || Royals || 8–2 || Price (4–4) || Ponson (1–7) || || 26,596 || 56–47
|-

|-  style="text-align:center; background:#bfb;"
| 104 || August 1 || Royals || 7–1 || Niemann (10–5) || Chen (0–6) || || 36,973 || 57–47
|-  style="text-align:center; background:#fbb;"
| 105 || August 2 || Royals || 4–1 || Bannister (7–7) || Shields (6–8) || Soria (18) || 27,930 || 57–48
|-  style="text-align:center; background:#bfb;"
| 106 || August 3 || Royals || 10–4 || Kazmir (6–6) || Greinke (10–7) || || 24,219 || 58–48
|-  style="text-align:center; background:#bfb;"
| 107 || August 4 || Red Sox || 4–2  (13) || Cormier (2–1) || Saito (2–3) || || 29,873 || 59–48 
|-  style="text-align:center; background:#bfb;"
| 108 || August 5 || Red Sox || 6–4 || Price (5–4) || Penny (7–6) || Howell (12) || 31,517 || 60–48
|-  style="text-align:center; background:#fbb;"
| 109 || August 7 || @ Mariners || 7–6  (11) || Kelley (4–1) || Howell (6–3) || || 44,378 || 60–49
|-  style="text-align:center; background:#bfb;"
| 110 || August 8 || @ Mariners || 10–4 || Shields (7–8) || Jakubauskas (5–7) || || 28,239 || 61–49
|-  style="text-align:center; background:#fbb;"
| 111 || August 9 || @ Mariners || 11–2 || Rowland-Smith (2–1) || Kazmir (6–7) || || 28,490 || 61–50
|-  style="text-align:center; background:#fbb;"
| 112 || August 10 || @ Angels || 8–7 || Jepsen (4–3) || Springer (0–2) || Fuentes (16) || 37,388 || 61–51
|-  style="text-align:center; background:#fbb;"
| 113 || August 11 || @ Angels || 6–0 || Santana (5–6) || Price (5–5) || || 43,559 || 61–52
|-  style="text-align:center; background:#fbb;"
| 114 || August 12 || @ Angels || 10–5 || Bulger (5–1) || Balfour (4–2) || || 37,589 || 61–53
|-  style="text-align:center; background:#fbb;"
| 115 || August 14 || Blue Jays || 5–2 || Halladay (13–5) || Shields (7–9) || Frasor (6) || 21,522 || 61–54
|-  style="text-align:center; background:#bfb;"
| 116 || August 15 || Blue Jays || 8–3 || Kazmir (7–7) || Tallet (5–7) || || 29,632 || 62–54
|-  style="text-align:center; background:#bfb;"
| 117 || August 16 || Blue Jays || 5–2 || Wheeler (4–3) || League (1–5) || || 24,625 || 63–54
|-  style="text-align:center; background:#bfb;"
| 118 || August 18 || Orioles || 5–4 || Price (6–5) || Berken (2–11) || Howell (13) || 16,514 || 64–54
|-  style="text-align:center; background:#bfb;"
| 119 || August 19 || Orioles || 3–1 || Niemann (11–5) || Tillman (1–1) || Howell (14) || 18,474 || 65–54
|-  style="text-align:center; background:#fbb;"
| 120 || August 20 || Orioles || 8–7 || Matusz (2–2) || Shields (7–10) || Johnson (5) || 15,870 || 65–55
|-  style="text-align:center; background:#bfb;"
| 121 || August 21 || Rangers || 5–3 || Kazmir (8–7) || Nippert (4–2) || Howell (15) || 20,639 || 66–55
|-  style="text-align:center; background:#bfb;"
| 122 || August 22 || Rangers || 5–4  (10) || Balfour (5–2) || Grilli (1–3) || || 34,281 || 67–55
|-  style="text-align:center; background:#fbb;"
| 123 || August 23 || Rangers || 4–0 || Feldman (13–4) || Price (6–6) || || 29,101 || 67–56
|-  style="text-align:center; background:#bfb;"
| 124 || August 24 || @ Blue Jays || 12–7 || Niemann (12–5) || Halladay (13–7) || || 17,184 || 68–56
|-  style="text-align:center; background:#bfb;"
| 125 || August 25 || @ Blue Jays || 7–3 || Shields (8–10) || Cecil (5–3) || || 17,307 || 69–56
|-  style="text-align:center; background:#fbb;"
| 126 || August 26 || @ Blue Jays || 3–2 || League (2–5) || Howell (6–4) || || 15,349 || 69–57
|-  style="text-align:center; background:#fbb;"
| 127 || August 28 || @ Tigers || 6–2 || Porcello (11–8) || Garza (7–9) || || 35,030 || 69–58 
|-  style="text-align:center; background:#bfb;"
| 128 || August 29 || @ Tigers || 3–1 || Price (7–6) || Robertson (1–1) || Howell (16) || 39,296 || 70–58
|-  style="text-align:center; background:#fbb;"
| 129 || August 30 || @ Tigers || 4–3 || Verlander (15–7) || Balfour (5–3) || Rodney (29) || 36,067 || 70–59 
|-  style="text-align:center; background:#bfb;"
| 130 || August 31 || @ Tigers || 11–7 || Shields (9–10) || Washburn (9–8) || || 26,533 || 71–59 
|-

|-  style="text-align:center; background:#fbb;"
| 131 || September 1 || Red Sox || 8–4 || Lester (11–7) || Sonnanstine (6–8) || Papelbon (33) || 17,692 || 71–60 
|-  style="text-align:center; background:#bfb;"
| 132 || September 2 || Red Sox || 8–5 || Howell (7–4) || Ramírez (7–4) || Wheeler (2) || 19,148 || 72–60 
|-  style="text-align:center; background:#fbb;"
| 133 || September 3 || Red Sox || 6–3 || Buchholz (4–3) || Price (7–7) || Papelbon (34) || 20,823 || 72–61 
|-  style="text-align:center; background:#fbb;"
| 134 || September 4 || Tigers || 4–3 || Verlander (16–7) || Howell (7–5) || Rodney (32) || 18,596 || 72–62 
|-  style="text-align:center; background:#fbb;"
| 135 || September 5 || Tigers || 8–6 || Seay (5–2) || Balfour (5–4) || Lyon (2) || 36,973 || 72–63
|-  style="text-align:center; background:#fbb;"
| 136 || September 6 || Tigers || 4–3 || Jackson (12–6) || Springer (0–3) || Lyon (3) || 28,059 || 72–64
|-  style="text-align:center; background:#fbb;"
| 137 || September 7 || @ Yankees || 4–1 || Hughes (6–3) || Cormier (2–2) || Rivera (39) || 47,436 || 72–65
|-  style="text-align:center; background:#fbb;"
| 138 || September 7 || @ Yankees || 11–1 || Burnett (11–8) || Sonnanstine (6–9) || || 45,953 || 72–66
|-  style="text-align:center; background:#fbb;"
| 139 || September 8 || @ Yankees || 3–2 || Rivera (2–2) || Wheeler (4–4) || || 45,350 || 72–67
|-  style="text-align:center; background:#fbb;"
| 140 || September 9 || @ Yankees || 4–2 || Albaladejo (5–1) || Cormier (2–3) || || 45,848 || 72–68
|-  style="text-align:center; background:#bbb;"
| || September 11 || @ Red Sox || colspan=6 |Postponed
|-  style="text-align:center; background:#fbb;"
| 141 || September 12 || @ Red Sox || 9–1  (F/6) || Beckett (15–6) || Davis (0–1) || || 37,755 || 72–69
|-  style="text-align:center; background:#fbb;"
| 142 || September 13 || @ Red Sox || 3–1 || Okajima (6–0) || Garza (7–10) || Papelbon (36) || 38,228 || 72–70
|-  style="text-align:center; background:#fbb;"
| 143 || September 13 || @ Red Sox || 4–0 || Lester (13–7) || Shields (9–11) || || 37,271 || 72–71
|-  style="text-align:center; background:#bfb;"
| 144 || September 14 || @ Orioles || 8–4 || Price (8–7) || Hernandez (4–8) || || 10,628 || 73–71
|-  style="text-align:center; background:#fbb;"
| 145 || September 15 || @ Orioles || 10–5 || Berken (5–11) || Niemann (12–6) || || 11,575 || 73–72
|-  style="text-align:center; background:#fbb;"
| 146 || September 16 || @ Orioles || 4–2 || Johnson (4–5) || Springer (0–4) || || 10,548 || 73–73
|-  style="text-align:center; background:#bfb;"
| 147 || September 17 || @ Orioles || 3–0 || Davis (1–1) || Hendrickson (5–5) || || 12,436 || 74–73
|-  style="text-align:center; background:#bfb;"
| 148 || September 18 || Blue Jays || 11–4 || Shields (10–11) ||Richmond (6–10) || || 18,426 || 75–73
|-  style="text-align:center; background:#bfb;"
| 149 || September 19 || Blue Jays || 4–1 || Garza (8–10) || Romero (12–9) || || 22,705 || 76–73
|-  style="text-align:center; background:#bfb;"
| 150 || September 20 || Blue Jays || 3–0 || Price (9–7) || Halladay (15–10) || Howell (17) || 20,937 || 77–73
|-  style="text-align:center; background:#fbb;"
| 151 || September 22 || Mariners || 4–3 || Batista (7–4) || Wheeler (4–5) || Lowe (3) || 12,514 || 77–74
|-  style="text-align:center; background:#bfb;"
| 152 || September 23 || Mariners || 5–4 || Springer (1–4) || Lowe (2–7) || Choate (5) || 13,009 || 78–74
|-  style="text-align:center; background:#fbb;"
| 153 || September 25 || @ Rangers || 8–3 || Holland (8–12) || Shields (10–12) || || 29,232 || 78–75
|-  style="text-align:center; background:#fbb;"
| 154 || September 26 || @ Rangers || 15–3 || Millwood (12–10) || Garza (8–11) || || 31,855 || 78–76
|-  style="text-align:center; background:#bfb;"
| 155 || September 27 || @ Rangers || 7–6 || Choate (1–0) || Francisco (2–3) || Cormier (2) || 37,905 || 79–76
|-  style="text-align:center; background:#bfb;"
| 156 || September 28 || Orioles || 7–6 || Cormier (3–3) || Ray (0–4) || Balfour (2) || 10,352 || 80–76
|-  style="text-align:center; background:#bfb;"
| 157 || September 29 || Orioles || 3–1 || Davis (2–1) || Guthrie (10–17) || Balfour (3) || 10,349 || 81–76
|-  style="text-align:center; background:#bfb;"
| 158 || September 30 || Orioles || 5–3 || Shields (11–12) || Hernandez (4–10) || Springer (1) || 10,554 || 82–76
|-

|-  style="text-align:center; background:#fbb;"
| 159 || October 1 || Orioles || 3–2 || Waters (1–0) || Garza (8–12) || Johnson (9) || 10,716 || 82–77
|-  style="text-align:center; background:#bfb;"
| 160 || October 2 || Yankees || 13–4 || Price (10–7) || Sabathia (19–8) || || 22,704 || 83–77
|-  style="text-align:center; background:#bfb;"
| 161 || October 3 || Yankees || 5–3 || Niemann (13–6) || Pettitte (14–8) || Balfour (3) || 30,084 || 84–77
|-  style="text-align:center; background:#fbb;"
| 162 || October 4 || Yankees || 10–2 || Burnett (13–9) || Davis (2–2) || || 28,699 || 84–78
|-

Player stats
Statistics as of October 4, 2009

Batting
Note: G = Games played; AB = At bats; R = Runs scored; H = Hits; 2B = Doubles; 3B = Triples; HR = Home runs; RBI = Runs batted in; AVG = Batting average; SB = Stolen bases

Pitching
Note: W = Wins; L = Losses; ERA = Earned run average; G = Games pitched; GS = Games started; SV = Saves; IP = Innings pitched; H = Hits allowed; R = Runs allowed; ER = Earned runs allowed; BB = Walks allowed; K = Strikeouts

Roster

Farm system

LEAGUE CHAMPIONS: Durham

References

External links

2009 Tampa Bay Rays season official site
2009 Tampa Bay Rays season at Baseball Reference

Tampa Bay Rays seasons
Tampa Bay Rays
Tampa Bay Rays